Kedzie may refer to:

People with the surname
Frank S. Kedzie (1857–1935), American academic, president of the Michigan Agricultural College 1915–1921
John H. Kedzie (1815–1903), American lawyer, real-estate developer, and politician; a figure in the history of Chicago
Julie Kedzie (b. 1981), American mixed martial artist
Neal Kedzie (b. 1965), American politician from Wisconsin; state legislator

CTA stations
 on the Brown Line
 on the Green Line
 on the Blue Line
 on the Pink Line
 on the Orange Line
Kedzie on the Garfield Park branch

Metra stations
Kedzie station (Metra) on the Union Pacific / West Line

Other
Kedzie Avenue, street in Chicago
Kędzie, village in Poland